Young Blood (German: Junges Blut) is a 1926 German silent drama film directed by Manfred Noa and starring Lya De Putti, Walter Slezak and Angelo Ferrari. The film's art direction was by Oscar Friedrich Werndorff. It premiered in Berlin on 23 March 1926.

Cast
 Lya De Putti as Schauspielerin Grita 
 Walter Slezak as Oberprimaner 
 Angelo Ferrari as Schlagertexter 
 Grit Haid as Schauspielerin 
 Grete Mosheim as Obersekundanerin 
 Maria Reisenhofer as Mutter des Oberprimaners 
 Emil Heyse   
 Geza L. Weiss
 Julius Falkenstein  
 Karl Etlinger   
 Karl Elzer  
 Rudolf Lettinger

References

Bibliography
 Grange, William. Cultural Chronicle of the Weimar Republic. Scarecrow Press, 2008.

External links

1926 films
1926 drama films
German drama films
Films of the Weimar Republic
German silent feature films
Films directed by Manfred Noa
German black-and-white films
Terra Film films
Silent drama films
1920s German films